Route 3 is 92 kilometres long and goes from Route 170 in St. Stephen to Route 2 (the Trans-Canada Highway) at Longs Creek, near Fredericton.

From St. Stephen, Route 3 goes north along the west bank of Dennis Stream, through the community of Moores Mills. The road turns northeast through Lawrence Station and mostly uninhabited land to meet Route 4 near York Mills. From there, Route 3 continues in a northeasterly direction through Harvey Station, then turns north to the Trans-Canada Highway at Longs Creek.

There have been no major changes or realignments to Route 3 since the 1950s.

Junction list

See also
List of New Brunswick provincial highways

References

003
003
003
St. Stephen, New Brunswick